"Slide" is a song written, arranger and performed by American R&B/funk band Slave. It was released in 1977 through Cotillion Records as a lead single from their self-titled debut album Slave. Production was handled by Jeff Dixon.

The song peaked at number 32 on the US Billboard Hot 100 and topped the US Hot R&B/Hip-Hop Songs. It also reached number 58 on the Canadian RPM Top 100 Singles chart.

Track listing

Personnel
Stephen C. Washington – songwriter, arrangement
Mark Hicks – songwriter, arrangement
Mark Leslie Adams – songwriter, arrangement
Daniel Webster – songwriter, arrangement
Tom Dozier – songwriter, arrangement
Floyd Miller – songwriter, arrangement
Tom Lockett Jr. – songwriter, arrangement
Orion Wilhoite – songwriter, arrangement
Carter Bradley – songwriter, arrangement
Jeff Dixon – producer

Charts

Weekly charts

Year-end charts

In popular culture
The song later appeared on the soundtrack to Marcus Raboy's 2002 Christmas-themed stoner film Friday After Next.
The song was used in the 8th episode "Nobody Has to Get Hurt" of the second season of American period drama television series The Deuce.

Samples

The song was sampled for A Tribe Called Quest's "Go Ahead in the Rain" from their debut album. 
The song was also sampled for Travi$ Scott's "Flying High" from his 2015 album Rodeo.

See also
List of Hot Soul Singles number ones of 1977

References

External links

1977 songs
Funk songs
1977 debut singles
Cotillion Records singles